On February 16, 2001, U.S. president George W. Bush ordered air strikes on five military targets near the Iraqi capital of Baghdad. The strikes came in response to imminent Iraqi threats to aircraft patrolling the no-fly zones. Many countries, including U.S. allies, have condemned the airstrikes, which they have called illegal. The U.S. military said the bombing was essentially a self-defense operation. It was president Bush's first military action since taking office.

Background 
U.S. and British officials base the no-fly zones on UN Security Council Resolution 688, which demands that Iraq end the oppression of its population, and on the ceasefire agreement after the Gulf War that prevent Iraq from interfering in allied air operations over Iraq

Reactions 
Iraq described the act as an "aggression and a unilateral use of force against the sovereignty of an independent state."

A Kuwaiti official said his country "neither permits nor condemns the strikes". Egypt, Saudi Arabia, Jordan and Turkey have expressed levels of opposition to the bombing. The U.S. president, speaking from Mexico during a meeting with President Vicente Fox, described the bombing as a "routine mission to enforce the no-fly zone". "It was a task that I was informed of and authorized, but I repeat, it's a routine mission." In London, British Prime Minister Tony Blair's office said Defense Secretary Geoff Hoon authorized the raids earlier this week after discussions with the United States.

References 

Iraq–United States military relations
Conflicts in 2001
Airstrikes conducted by the United States
Airstrikes conducted by the United Kingdom
February 2001 events in Iraq
Presidency of George W. Bush
2001 in Iraq